Pentagon Mountain is an  mountain summit located in Flathead County of the U.S. state of Montana.

Description

Pentagon Mountain is the highest point in the Trilobite Range, which is a subset of the Flathead Range. It is set within the Bob Marshall Wilderness, on land managed by Flathead National Forest. Precipitation runoff from the mountain drains west and south to the Spotted Bear River via Pentagon Creek, and north to the Middle Fork Flathead River via Clack Creek. The nearest higher neighbor is Three Sisters,  to the south.

Climate

Based on the Köppen climate classification, Pentagon Mountain is located in a subarctic climate zone characterized by long, usually very cold winters, and short, cool to mild summers. Winter temperatures can drop below −10 °F with wind chill factors below −30 °F.

Geology

Pentagon Mountain is composed of sedimentary rock laid down during the Precambrian to Jurassic periods.

Gallery

See also
 Geology of the Rocky Mountains

References

External links
 Weather: Pentagon Mountain
 Summit photo: umt.edu

Mountains of Flathead County, Montana
Mountains of Montana
North American 2000 m summits
Flathead National Forest